Vittadinia gracilis, known by the common name woolly New Holland daisy, is a perennial shrub mostly seen in the southern parts of Australia. It is a member of the family Asteraceae. A small plant, 10 to 40 cm high with erect stems. Leaves are flat or folded on the centre, linear to narrow lanceolate or spathulate, 10 to 40 mm long, 2 to 7 mm wide. Stems form annually from a woody base with a coating of dense, fine white hairs, less often seen on the leaves. The specific epithet gracilis is derived from the Latin adjective gracilis ("slender", "thin", or "graceful").

References

Astereae
Asterales of Australia
Flora of New South Wales
Flora of South Australia
Flora of Queensland
Flora of Western Australia
Flora of Tasmania
Plants described in 1982